Rangamati Shahi (also Rangmati Shahi) is a Nepali politician and a member of the House of Representatives of the federal parliament of Nepal. She was elected from Nepali Congress under the proportional representation system, filling the seat reserved for the backward regions of the country. She is also a member of the parliamentary Development and Technology Committee. She is also a member of the Ministry of Sports and Youth in the shadow cabinet of Nepali Congress.

References

Living people
Place of birth missing (living people)
21st-century Nepalese women
21st-century Nepalese politicians
Nepali Congress politicians from Karnali Province
Nepal MPs 2017–2022
1973 births